is a prefecture of Japan located on the island of Shikoku. Ehime Prefecture has a population of 1,342,011 (1 June 2019) and has a geographic area of 5,676 km2 (2,191 sq mi). Ehime Prefecture borders Kagawa Prefecture to the northeast, Tokushima Prefecture to the east, and Kōchi Prefecture to the southeast.

Matsuyama is the capital and largest city of Ehime Prefecture and the largest city on Shikoku, with other major cities including Imabari, Niihama, and Saijō.

Notable past Ehime residents include three Nobel Prize winners: they are Kenzaburo Oe (1994 Nobel Prize in Literature), Shuji Nakamura (2014 Nobel Prize in Physics), and Syukuro Manabe (2021 Nobel Prize in Physics).

History

Until the Meiji Restoration, Ehime Prefecture was known as Iyo Province. Since before the Heian period, the area was dominated by fishermen and sailors who played an important role in defending Japan against pirates and Mongolian invasions.

After the Battle of Sekigahara, the Tokugawa shōgun gave the area to his allies, including Katō Yoshiaki who built Matsuyama Castle, forming the basis for the modern city of Matsuyama.

The name Ehime comes from the kuniumi part of the Kojiki where Iyo Province is mythologically named Ehime, "lovely princess".

In 2012, a research group from the University of Tokyo and Ehime University said they had discovered rare earth deposits in Matsuyama.

Geography
Located in the northwestern part of Shikoku, Ehime faces the Seto Inland Sea to the north and is bordered by Kagawa and Tokushima in the east and Kōchi in the south.

The prefecture includes both high mountains in the inland region and a long coastline, with many islands in the Seto Inland Sea.  The westernmost arm of Ehime, the Sadamisaki Peninsula, is the narrowest peninsula in Japan.

As of 31 March 2020, 7 percent of the total land area of the prefecture was designated as Natural Parks, namely the Ashizuri-Uwakai and Setonaikai National Parks; Ishizuchi Quasi-National Park; and Hijikawa, Kinshako, Okudōgo Tamagawa, Sadamisaki Hantō-Uwakai, Saragamine Renpō, Sasayama, and Shikoku Karst Prefectural Natural Parks.

Cities

Eleven cities are located in Ehime Prefecture:

Towns and villages
These are the towns in each district:

Mergers

Former districts:

Uwa District (historical)
Uma District
Shūsō District
Onsen District

Economy
The coastal areas around Imabari and Saijō host a number of industries, including dockyards of Japan's largest shipbuilder, Imabari Shipbuilding. Chemical industries, oil refining, paper and cotton textile products also are a feature of the prefecture. Rural areas mostly engage in agricultural and fishing industries, and are particularly known for citrus fruits such as mikan (mandarin orange), iyokan and cultured pearls.

Ikata Nuclear Power Plant produces a large portion of Shikoku Electric Power.

Education

Universities and colleges

National
Ehime University

Prefectural
Ehime Prefectural University of Health Science

Private
St. Catherine University
Matsuyama University
Matsuyama Shinonome College (women's college)

Senior high schools

Prefectural
Ehime Prefectural Matsuyama Central Senior High School
Ehime Prefectural Matsuyama Higashi High School
Ehime Prefectural Mishima High School
Ehime Prefectural Uwajima Fisheries High School

Sports

The sports teams listed below are based in Ehime.

Football (soccer)
Ehime F.C.
FC Imabari

Baseball
Ehime Mandarin Pirates

Basketball
Ehime Orange Vikings

Culture
The oldest extant hot spring in Japan, Dōgo Onsen, is located in Matsuyama.  It has been used for over two thousand years.

These are television shows and movies set in Ehime Prefecture.
 Tokyo Love Story is a story with characters are from Ehime Prefecture. Therefore, a lot of shooting was done in Ehime. Baishinji Station is famous for being filmed.
 Shodō Girls  was made based on the true story of a high school student in Shikokuchūō. A member of the calligraphy club began doing Performance calligraphy at shopping malls and events to liven up the local region. After that, the Shodō Performance Koshien (書道パフォーマンス甲子園) was held in 2008.
 Botchan is a novel written by Natsume Sōseki. It was based on his experience in Matsuyama. Movies, dramas, and manga are published based on the novel. Botchan Ressha and Botchan Stadium  are associated with this.
 Saka no Ue no Kumo  is written by Ryōtarō Shiba. The main characters are Akiyama Yoshifuru, Akiyama Saneyuki and Masaoka Shiki, all of whom are from Ehime prefecture. It was broadcast on NHK as a TV drama.
Koi wa Go・Hichi・Go！ （恋は五・七・五！）is set in Haiku Koshien, which is actually performed. The shooting was done at a high school, university, and library in Ehime. The haiku of this movie was supervised by Itsuki Natsui, haiku poet from Ehime.
 Destruction Babies (ディストラクション・ベイビーズ) is set in Ehime. This movie was made based on the true story that the director head from a person he met when he visited Matsuyama. The director won an award at the Locarno Festival in 2016, and the film was selected as semi-grand prix at the Three Continents Festival in 2016.
 My-HiME is set in Ehime.

There are major festivals in Ehime Prefecture.
Uwajima Ushi-oni Festival is held for three days, with a parade of many Ushi-oni walking around the city, a traditional Uwajima dance, a fireworks display, and a run on the final day.
Niihama Taiko Festival is the autumn festival in Niihama. The drum stand is lifted by about 150 men. It is one of the three biggest fight festivals in Japan.
The Matsuyama Autumn Festival includes a mikoshi event called Hachiawase (鉢合わせ) which takes place near Dōgo Onsen and Isaniwa Shrine.

Hot Springs
These are Hot Springs in Ehime Prefecture.
Dōgo Onsen appears in the Nihon Shoki. This Hot Spring has three public baths: the main building, Tsubaki no Yu, and Asuka no Yu.
Sora to Mori is a combined warm bath facility. There are hot springs, restaurants, and body care.
Nibukawa Onsen is a hot spring located in Imabari. The source originates from the crevices of the Inugawa Valley in this hot spring town.

Language
Iyo dialect is a Japanese dialect spoken in Ehime Prefecture. Nanyo is influenced by the Kyushu dialect, and Chuyo and Toyo are influenced by the Kinki dialect.

Museums
 Museum of Ehime History and Culture
 Kaimei School

Transport

Railway
Shikoku Railway (JR Shikoku)
Yosan Line
Yodo Line
Uchiko Line
Iyo Railway (Iyotetsu)
Gunchū Line
Takahama Line
Yokogawara Line
Matsuyama Inner Line

Road

Expressway
Matsuyama Expressway
Tokushima Expressway
Takamatsu Expressway
Kochi Expressway
Nishiseto Expressway (also referred to as the Shimanami Kaidō)
Imabari Komatsu Road

National highways

Route 11
Route 33 (Matsuyama-Kōchi)
Route 56 (Matsuyama-Iyo-Uwajima-Sukumo-Susaki-Kōchi)
Route 192 (Saijyo-Shikoku Chuo-Yoshinogawa-Tokushima)
Route 194
Route 196
Route 197
Route 317 (Matsuyama-Imabari-Onomichi)
Route 319
Route 320
Route 378
Route 380
Route 437
Route 440
Route 441
Route 494 (Matsuyama-Niyodogawa-Susaki)

Ports
Kawanoe Port
Niihama Port - Ferry route to Osaka
Toyo Port - Ferry route to Osaka
Imabari Port - Ferry route to Innoshima, Hakata Island, and international container hub port
Matsuyama Port - Ferry route to Kitakyushu, Yanai, Hiroshima, Kure, and international container hub port
Yawatahama Port - Ferry route to Beppu, Usuki
Misaki Port - Ferry route to Oita
Uwajima Port

Airport
Matsuyama Airport

Notable people
 

 Naoki Kuwata (born 1977), actor and model

International sister cities / Economic exchange counterparts
Ehime Prefecture is making use of its long tradition of involvement with people overseas through international exchanges in areas such as the economy, culture, sports and education.
  Dalian (China)
  Liaoning (China)
  British Columbia (Canada)
  Queensland (Australia)
  New South Wales (Australia)
  Hawaii (United States)

Notes

References
 Nussbaum, Louis-Frédéric and Käthe Roth. (2005). Japan encyclopedia. Cambridge: Harvard University Press. ; OCLC 58053128

External links

 

 
Shikoku region
Prefectures of Japan